Fan Ruiwei (born 19 August 2002) is a Chinese footballer currently playing as a defender for Guangzhou.

Career statistics

Club
.

References

2002 births
Living people
Chinese footballers
China youth international footballers
Association football defenders
Atlético Madrid footballers
Guangzhou F.C. players
21st-century Chinese people
Chinese expatriate footballers
Chinese expatriate sportspeople in Spain
Expatriate footballers in Spain